The Bandy Federation of India takes care of Bandy in India. Its headquarters are in Mandi in Himachal Pradesh. Bandy is generally played in northern India where there is generally snow and ice. India is one of seven countries in Asia and in total 32 to be a member of Federation of International Bandy. BFI planned to send a team to the 2011 Asian Winter Games in Astana-Almaty, but ultimately didn't. To the World Championship that year India was not allowed to come because the tournament format at the time did not allow several new countries. The international debut was then supposed to take place at the first Asian Bandy Championships, which was to be held in Almaty in December 2012. However, that tournament did not take place.

References

 
Sport in India by sport
Sport in India